Accession number may refer to:

 Accession number (bioinformatics), a unique identifier given to a biological polymer sequence (DNA, protein) when it is submitted to a sequence database
 Accession number (library science), the unique number given to each new acquisition  as it is entered in the catalog of a library or museum